17th FAI World Precision Flying Championship took place between July 21–26, 2006 in Troyes in France, altogether with the 15th FAI World Rally Flying Championship (July 26–31).

There were 61 competitors from Poland (8), Czech Republic (8), France (7), South Africa (7), Austria (6), United Kingdom (4), Russia (4), Sweden (3), Finland (3), Denmark (2), Norway (2), Switzerland (2), Lithuania (2), Germany (1),  Slovenia (1), Cyprus (1).

Most popular airplane was Cessna 152 (30 crews), then Cessna 150 (18), Cessna 172 (6), 3Xtrim (2). There were also single pilots flying Glastar, PZL Wilga 2000, Piper J-3, MS-880 and HB-23.

Contest
July 15 and July 17 to July 21 - unofficial practice
July 21 - Final arrivals, opening briefing
July 22 - Landing practice and opening ceremony
July 23 - Landing test
July 24 - First navigation test
July 25 - Second navigation test
July 26 - Reserve day, awards giving and closing ceremony
July 27 - Departures

On July 23 there was a landing competition, in which the first place was taken by Ron Stirk (South Africa, C152, 2 penalty points), the second and third by Anton Tonninger (Austria, C152, 4 pts) and Burkard Ryska (Germany, C152, 4 pts).

In the first navigation test on July 24, the first place was taken by Krzysztof Wieczorek (Poland, 113 pts), the second by Petr Opat (Czech, 126 pts), the third by Wacław Wieczorek (Poland, 139 pts - Krzysztof's brother, flying PZL-104 Wilga 2000).

On July 25 there was the last, second navigation competition, in which the first two places were taken by the Poles: Janusz Darocha (53 pts) and Wacław Wieczorek (78 pts), then Jiri Filip (Czech, 95 pts).

The first three places were taken by the Poles, the next by the Czechs, including Jiří and Michel Filip brothers on the 4th and 5th place.

Results
Individual:

Competitor / country / aircraft / registration / 1st + 2nd + 3rd test penalty points = total

Team:
 - 767 pts (Krzysztof Wieczorek 224 pts, Janusz Darocha 262 pts, Krzysztof Skrętowicz 281 pts)
 - 930 pts (Jiří Filip 285 pts, Michal Filip 305 pts, Petr Opat 340 pts)
 - 1268 pts (Nathalie Strube 389 pts, Eric Daspet 403 pts #11, Patrick Bats 476 pts #15)
 - 2598 pts
 - 2878 pts
 - 3133 pts
 - 4629 pts
 - 6272 pts
- 6978 pts

External links
Troyes 2006 - Official Home Page

Precision Flying 17
FAI World Precision Flying Championship
2006 in France
Fédération Aéronautique Internationale
Aviation history of France